Manulea is a genus of flowering plants belonging to the family Scrophulariaceae.

Its native range is Africa.

Species:

Manulea acutiloba 
Manulea adenocalyx 
Manulea adenodes 
Manulea altissima 
Manulea androsacea 
Manulea annua 
Manulea arabidea 
Manulea aridicola 
Manulea augei 
Manulea bellidifolia 
Manulea buchneroides 
Manulea burchellii 
Manulea caledonica 
Manulea cephalotes 
Manulea cheiranthus 
Manulea chrysantha 
Manulea cinerea 
Manulea conferta 
Manulea corymbosa 
Manulea crassifolia 
Manulea decipiens 
Manulea derustiana 
Manulea deserticola 
Manulea diandra 
Manulea dregei 
Manulea dubia 
Manulea exigua 
Manulea flanaganii 
Manulea florifera 
Manulea fragrans 
Manulea gariepina 
Manulea gariesiana 
Manulea glandulosa 
Manulea incana 
Manulea juncea 
Manulea karrooica 
Manulea latiloba 
Manulea laxa 
Manulea leiostachys 
Manulea leptosiphon 
Manulea linearifolia 
Manulea minor 
Manulea minuscula 
Manulea montana 
Manulea multispicata 
Manulea namibensis 
Manulea nervosa 
Manulea obovata 
Manulea ovatifolia 
Manulea paniculata 
Manulea parviflora 
Manulea paucibarbata 
Manulea pillansii 
Manulea platystigma 
Manulea plurirosulata 
Manulea praeterita 
Manulea psilostoma 
Manulea pusilla 
Manulea ramulosa 
Manulea rhodantha 
Manulea rhodesiana 
Manulea rigida 
Manulea robusta 
Manulea rubra 
Manulea schaeferi 
Manulea silenoides 
Manulea stellata 
Manulea tenella 
Manulea thyrsiflora 
Manulea tomentosa 
Manulea turrita 
Manulea virgata

References

Scrophulariaceae
Scrophulariaceae genera